Sogasu Chooda Tarama!  is a 1995 Telugu language romance film directed by Gunasekhar. The film stars Naresh, Indraja, Tanikella Bharani, Mallikarjuna Rao, and Ramana Murthy. The film won four Nandi Awards. It was not commercially successful. The film is an unofficial remake of 1993 American film Indecent Proposal.

Cast

Naresh as Venkat Rao
Indraja as Neelima
Tanikella Bharani
Mallikarjuna Rao
Ramana Murthy
Devadas Kanakala

Soundtrack

Awards
Nandi Awards
 Best Feature Film - Gold - K. Ram Gopal 
 Best Dialogue Writer -  Ajay Shanti
 Best Costume Designer - Koteswara Rao
 Best Screenplay Writer - Gunasekhar

References

External links
 

1995 films
1990s Telugu-language films
Indian romance films
Indian films about gambling
Films directed by Gunasekhar
Indian remakes of American films
Films scored by Bharadwaj (composer)
1990s romance films